Jagged Mountain is a high mountain summit in the Needle Mountains range of the Rocky Mountains of North America.

See also

List of Colorado mountain ranges
List of Colorado mountain summits
List of Colorado 4000 meter prominent summits
List of Colorado county high points

References

San Juan Mountains (Colorado)
Mountains of La Plata County, Colorado
North American 4000 m summits
San Juan National Forest
Mountains of Colorado